The Homeland Security Exercise and Evaluation Program (HSEEP) provides a set of guiding principles for exercise programs, as well as a common approach to exercise program management, design and development, conduct, evaluation, and improvement planning.

History and justification
In 2002, the National Strategy for Homeland Security motivated Homeland Security Presidential Directives (HSPD) 5, 7, and 8 providing the national initiatives. Within these initiatives, HSEEP focuses on development of exercise around capabilities-based planning, National Response Plan (NRP), National Incident Management System (NIMS), the Universal Task List (UTL) and the Target Capabilities List (TCL) as established by the U.S. Federal Government.

Documents
HSEEP exercise and evaluation doctrine is flexible, scalable, adaptable, and is for use by stakeholders across the whole community.   HSEEP doctrine is applicable for exercises across all mission areas—prevention, protection, mitigation, response, and recovery.  Using HSEEP supports the National Preparedness System by providing a consistent approach to exercises and measuring progress toward building, sustaining, and delivering core capabilities..

HSEEP doctrine is based on national best practices and is supported by training, technology systems, tools, and technical assistance.  The National Exercise Program (NEP) is consistent with the HSEEP methodology.  Exercise practitioners are encouraged to apply and adapt HSEEP doctrine to meet their specific needs.

The doctrine is organized as follows:

Chapter 1
Chapter 1:  HSEEP Fundamentals describes the basic principles and methodology of HSEEP.

Chapter 2
Chapter 2:  Exercise Program Management provides guidance for conducting a Training and Exercise Planning Workshop (TEPW) and developing a Multi-year Training and Exercise Plan (TEP).

Chapter 3
Chapter 3:  Exercise Design and Development describes the methodology for developing exercise objectives, conducting planning meetings, developing exercise documentation, and planning for exercise logistics, control, and evaluation.

Chapter 4
Chapter 4:  Exercise Conduct provides guidance on setup, exercise play, and wrap-up activities.

Chapter 5
Chapter 5:  Evaluation provides the approach to exercise evaluation planning and conduct through data collection, analysis, and development of an AAR.

Chapter 6
Chapter 6: Improvement Planning addresses corrective actions identified in the exercise IP and the process of tracking corrective actions to resolution.

Roles of exercises
Exercises play a vital role in national preparedness by enabling whole community stakeholders to test and validate plans and capabilities, and identify both capability gaps and areas for improvement. A well-designed exercise provides a low-risk environment to test capabilities, familiarize personnel with roles and responsibilities, and foster meaningful interaction and communication across organizations. Exercises bring together and strengthen the whole community in its efforts to prevent, protect against, mitigate, respond to, and recover from all hazards.

References

United States Department of Homeland Security
Disaster preparedness in the United States